Classic Rock (Local Version) (formerly known as Genuine Classic Rock) is a 24-hour music format produced by Dial Global, formerly by Waitt Radio Networks and then by the now-defunct Dial Global Local. Its playlist comprises classic rock music released from the 1960s to the 1980s from artists such as ZZ Top, Led Zeppelin, Aerosmith, Pink Floyd, Lynyrd Skynyrd, Tom Petty and Eric Clapton among others. 

In June 2012, due to reorganizations at Dial Global, the Dial Global Local 24/7 formats were fully integrated into Dial Global's portfolio of formats, and "Dial Global Local" ceased to exist as a brand name. However, most of the former Dial Global Local formats are still offered to affiliate stations in the same manner in which they were previously offered. Genuine Classic Rock is no longer offered under that name, but continues as a Local version of Dial Global's Classic Rock format. By 2020, it’s still being used today

Competitor Networks
The Classic Rock Experience by ABC Radio Networks

External links  
Dial Global Classic Rock homepage

Radio formats
American radio networks